Queen Bilqis Airways is a privately held regional airline based in Aden, Yemen.

History
It was founded in 2013 and secured state approval in December 2016 and was set to start operations in summer 2017 but ended up commencing operations on 24 November 2018. Queen Bilqis Airways launched flights to Queen Alia International Airport in December 2018 and expanded coverage to Seiyun in the same month.

Destinations
As of 2018, Queen Bilqis Airways served the following destinations, while as of 2021, there are no scheduled routes operated.

References

External links
Official website

Low-cost carriers
Airlines of Yemen
Airlines established in 2013
2008 establishments in Yemen